Andrea Gilmore (born 27 October 1988) is an Australian netball and Australian rules football player with West Coast Fever in the ANZ Championship and West Coast Eagles in the AFL Women's competition (AFLW), respectively.

References

2009 West Coast Fever profile. Retrieved on 2009-03-15.

Australian netball players
West Coast Fever players
Adelaide Thunderbirds players
ANZ Championship players
1988 births
Living people
Western Sting players
Netball players from Western Australia
Australian Netball League players
West Australian Netball League players
Australian Institute of Sport netball players
Perth Orioles players
West Coast Eagles (AFLW) players